William Lygon, 7th Earl Beauchamp,  (20 February 1872 – 14 November 1938), styled Viscount Elmley until 1891, was a British Liberal politician. He was Governor of New South Wales between 1899 and 1901, a member of the Liberal administrations of Sir Henry Campbell-Bannerman and H. H. Asquith between 1905 and 1915, and leader of the Liberal Party in the House of Lords between 1924 and 1931. When political enemies threatened to make public his homosexuality he resigned from office to go into exile. Lord Beauchamp is often assumed to be the model for the character Lord Marchmain in Evelyn Waugh's novel Brideshead Revisited.

Background and education
Beauchamp was the eldest son of Frederick Lygon, 6th Earl Beauchamp, by his first wife, Lady Mary Catherine, daughter of Philip Stanhope, 5th Earl Stanhope. He was educated at Eton College and Christ Church, University of Oxford, where he showed an interest in evangelism, joining the Christian Social Union.

Early career

Beauchamp succeeded his father in the earldom in 1891 at the age of 18, and was mayor of Worcester between 1895 and 1896. A progressive in his ideas, he was surprised to be offered the post of Governor of New South Wales in May 1899. Though he was good at the job and enjoyed the company of local artists and writers, he was unpopular in the colony for a series of gaffes and misunderstandings, most notably over his reference to the 'birthstain' of Australia's convict origins. His open association with the high church and Anglo-Catholicism caused increased perturbation in the Evangelical Council.

In Sydney, William Carr Smith, rector of St James' Church was his chaplain. Beauchamp returned to Britain in 1900, saying that his duties had failed to stimulate him.

Political career
In 1902, Beauchamp joined the Liberal Party and the same year he married Lady Lettice Mary Elizabeth Grosvenor, the daughter of Victor Grosvenor, Earl Grosvenor. When the Liberals came to power under Henry Campbell-Bannerman in December 1905, Beauchamp was appointed Captain of the Honourable Corps of Gentlemen-at-Arms and was sworn of the Privy Council in January 1906. In July 1907, he became Lord Steward of the Household, a post he retained when H. H. Asquith became Prime Minister in 1908. He entered the cabinet as Lord President of the Council in June 1910, a post that he held until November of the same year, when he was appointed First Commissioner of Works.

Identified with the radical wing of the Liberal Party, Beauchamp also chaired (in December 1913) the Central Land and Housing Council, which was designed to advance Lloyd George's Land Campaign. He was again Lord President of the council from 1914 to 1915. However, he was not a member of the coalition government formed by Asquith in May 1915. Lord Beauchamp never returned to ministerial office but was the Liberal leader in the House of Lords from 1924 to 1931, supporting the ailing party with his substantial fortune.

While serving in Parliament, Beauchamp also voiced his support for a range of progressive measures such as workmen's compensation, an expansion in rural housing provision, an agricultural minimum wage, improved safety standards and reduced working hours for miners.

Other public appointments

Beauchamp was appointed Honorary Colonel of the 1st Worcestershire Royal Garrison Artillery (Volunteers) on 5 November 1902.

He was made Lord Lieutenant of Gloucestershire in 1911, carried the Sword of State at the coronation of King George V, was made Lord Warden of the Cinque Ports in 1913 and a Knight of the Garter in 1914. He was also Chancellor of the University of London and a Six Master (Governor of RGS Worcester).

In June 1901, Beauchamp received an honorary Doctor of Laws (LLD) degree from the University of Glasgow.

Sexuality and blackmail
In 1931, Lord Beauchamp was "outed" as a homosexual. Although Beauchamp's homosexuality was an open secret in parts of high society and one that his political opponents had refrained from using against him despite its illegality, Lady Beauchamp was oblivious to it and professed a confusion as to what homosexuality was when it was revealed. At one stage she thought her husband was being accused of being a bugler. He had numerous affairs at Madresfield and Walmer Castle, with his partners ranging from servants to socialites, including local men.

In 1930, while on a trip to Australia, it became common knowledge in London society that one of the men escorting him, Robert Bernays, a member of the Liberal Party, was a lover.

It was reported to King George V and Queen Mary by Beauchamp's Tory brother-in-law, the Duke of Westminster, who hoped to ruin the Liberal Party through Beauchamp, as well as Beauchamp personally due his private dislike of Beauchamp. Homosexual practice was a criminal offence at the time, and the King was horrified, rumoured to have said, "I thought men like that shot themselves".

The King had a personal interest in the case, as his sons Henry and George had visited Madresfield in the past. George was then in a relationship with Beauchamp's daughter Mary, which was cut off by her father's outing.

After sufficient evidence had been gathered by the Duke, Beauchamp was made an offer to separate from his wife Lettice, retire on a pretence and then leave the country. Beauchamp accepted and left the country immediately, living a nomadic life in the global "gay" hotspots of the time. Shortly afterwards, the Countess Beauchamp obtained a divorce. There was no public scandal, but Lord Beauchamp resigned all his offices.

Following his departure for the continent, his brother-in-law sent him a note which read. "Dear Bugger-in-law, you got what you deserved. Yours, Westminster."

Literary inspiration
Lord Beauchamp is generally supposed to have been the model for Lord Marchmain in Evelyn Waugh's novel, Brideshead Revisited. They were both aristocrats in exile, though for different reasons.

In his 1977 book, Homosexuals in History, historian A. L. Rowse suggests that Beauchamp's failed appointment as Governor of New South Wales was the inspiration for Hilaire Belloc's satirical children's poem, "Lord Lundy", which has in its final lines a command to Lord Lundy from his aged grandfather: "But as it is!...My language fails! Go out and govern New South Wales!". Nevertheless, says Rowse, "Lord Lundy's chronic weakness was tears. This was not Lord Beauchamp's weakness: he enjoyed life, was always gay."

Family

Lord Beauchamp married at Eccleston, Cheshire, on 26 July 1902 Lady Lettice Grosvenor, daughter of Victor Grosvenor, Earl Grosvenor, and Lady Sibell Lumley, and granddaughter of the 1st Duke of Westminster. They had three sons and four daughters:
 William Lygon, 8th Earl Beauchamp (3 July 1903 – 3 January 1979), the last Earl Beauchamp. His widow, Mona, née Else Schiewe, died in 1989.
 The Hon. Hugh Patrick Lygon (2 November 1904 – 19 August 1936, Rothenburg, Bavaria), said to be the model for Lord Sebastian Flyte in Brideshead Revisited.
 Lady Lettice Lygon (16 Jun 1906–1973), who married 1930 (div. 1958) Sir Richard Charles Geers Cotterell, 5th Bt. (1907–1978) and had children.
 Lady Sibell Lygon (10 October 1907 – 31 October 2005), who married 11 February 1939 (bigamously) and 1949 (legally) Michael Rowley (d. 19 September 1952), stepson of her maternal uncle, the 2nd Duke of Westminster.
 Lady Mary Lygon (12 February 1910 – 27 September 1982), who married 1937 (div.) HH Prince Vsevolod Ivanovich of Russia, and had no children.
 Lady Dorothy Lygon (22 February 1912 – 13 November 2001), who married 1985 (sep.) Robert Heber-Percy (d. 1987) of Faringdon, Berkshire.
 The Hon. Richard Edward Lygon (25 December 1916 – 1970), who married 1939 Patricia Janet Norman; their younger daughter Rosalind Lygon, now Lady Morrison (b. 1946), inherited Madresfield Court in 1979.

Lady Beauchamp died in 1936, aged 59, estranged from all her children except her youngest child. Lord Beauchamp died of cancer in New York City in 1938, aged 66. He was succeeded in the earldom by his eldest son, William.

References

Bibliography 
 
 
 
 
 Bloch, Michael (2015). Closet Queens. Little, Brown.  Chapter 1

External links
 
 Portrait of the 7th Earl (1899), by Sir Leslie Ward for Vanity Fair.  Retrieved 10 June 2008.
 Article on Lygon's influence on the plot for Brideshead Revisited

Governors of New South Wales
Lord Presidents of the Council
Lords Warden of the Cinque Ports
Members of the Privy Council of the United Kingdom
Chancellors of the University of London
Liberal Party (UK) hereditary peers
Lord-Lieutenants of Gloucestershire
Alumni of Christ Church, Oxford
Presidents of the Oxford Union
William 7
Knights Commander of the Order of St Michael and St George
Knights of the Garter
Gay politicians
British Anglo-Catholics
1872 births
1938 deaths
Deaths from cancer in New York (state)
Honourable Corps of Gentlemen at Arms
English LGBT politicians
Members of the London School Board
Colony of New South Wales people
Bisexual politicians
LGBT peers
William